GDS may refer to:

Government and politics 
 Citizens' Democratic Party, a political party in Bosnia and Herzegovina
 Government Digital Service, of the Government of the United Kingdom's Cabinet Office
 UK Government Decontamination Service

Schools
 Georgetown Day School, in Washington, D.C., United States
 Greensboro Day School, in North Carolina, United States

Technology
 Global Dialing Scheme, a numbering plan for H.323 audio-visual communication networks
 Global distribution system
 Goal Decision System, in association football
 Google Desktop Search
 Graph dynamical system

Other uses
 Gaelic Digital Service, in Scotland
 Game Developers Session, an annual conference
 Geriatric Depression Scale
 German Dharmaduta Society, a Buddhist organisation in Germany
 Ghandruk Sign Language
 Groupe de Développement Sportif
 Group for Social Dialogue, a Romanian human rights organisation
 .gds, a filename extension for GDSII files
 GDS, sister station of GTS

See also 
 GD (disambiguation)